Where is my Train is a smartphone application developed by Google for Indian Railways. The application was developed by Sigmoid Labs, composed of former TiVo Corporation developers. The company was acquired by Google in 2018.

History 
Where is my Train application was released in 2015 for Android.

References

External links 

Free application software
Travel technology
Indian travel websites
Route planning software
Indian Railways
Google software
Google acquisitions